Scott Huber (born June 5, 1981), better known by his stage name Babelfishh, is an American alternative hip hop artist currently based in Houston,Texas.

History
After gaining some recognition in local rap circles in Houston,Texas, and opening for notable acts like Zechs Marquise, Babelfishh self-released his debut album, The Use Of Of, in 2005. These releases were followed by 3 self-financed European tours with Oskar Ohlson in 2008,2009, 2011, and 2012 (to support Howl Bender).

Style
Babelfishh has been described as "less of an alley-hardened battle rapper and more of a geeky, deep-thinking street poet, with a touch of both sci-fi freak Mike Ladd and ex-Soul Coughing frontman/poet M. Doughty to the whole mess". His 2012 release, Howl Bender, was called "a masterpiece in terms of transfiguring pure emotion into a tangible, audible entity."

Name 
His stage name [Bablefishh] is in reference to the Bable Fish [a form of biological universal translator] from Douglas Adams' Hitchhiker's Guide to the Galaxy series (radio, novel, TV and film).

Discography

Albums
 The Use Of Of (2005)
 Tour CD 2008 (2008)
 8th World Jamboree Babelfishh, Lewee Regal (2008)
 Pinkie Swear Babelfishh, Oskar Ohlson (2009)
 Stay Home Babelfishh, Oskar Ohlson, Filkoe (2010)
 We'd Rather Not Babelfishh, Oskar Ohlson (2012)
 Howl Bender (2012)
 Anxiety Lesions (2014)
 Writhe In The Ailments (2015)

EPs
 Fathers First Musket (2008)
 Cole Wurl Hustle EP (2009)
 Extended Family, The (with The Beastmaster) (2010)
 667 : The Guild We Hold Close (with Edison) (2010)
 Tenshun & Babel Fishh (with Tenshun) (2011)
 Eyeless Terror (2011)
 Bloody-Chaos-Demo (2011)
 Skullinhanddemo (2011)
 Prison Soup (with Evak) (2012)

Singles
 "As the Loot Bag Laughs" (2011) (with AbSUrd)

Vinyl records
 Pinkie Swear Babelfishh, Osker Ohlson (2012) limited to 500 copies 12" vinyl (hand-numbered)
 Extended Family, The Babelfishh, The Beastmaster (2010) limited to 300 copies 7" vinyl (hand-numbered)

Guest appearances
 Papervehicle - "Another Cat Out of the Bag'' (2011)

References

External links
 
 
 

1981 births
American hip hop record producers
American male rappers
Living people
People from Redwood City, California
Rappers from California
Rappers from Houston
Underground rappers
21st-century American rappers
Record producers from Texas
Record producers from California
21st-century American male singers
21st-century American singers